Mihajlo Hranjac was a Croatian local builder active in the Republic of Ragusa (Dubrovnik).

The Outer Gate of Ploča was designed and constructed by him in 1628. He also worked on City Harbour.

See also
List of Croatian architects
Walls of Dubrovnik

References

Croatian architects
17th-century Croatian people
Year of birth unknown
Year of death unknown